Sandra D. Mitchell (born 1951) is an American philosopher of science and historian of ideas.  She holds the position of distinguished professor in the department of History and Philosophy of Science at the University of Pittsburgh, the top rated school in the world for the subject according to the 2011 Philosophical Gourmet Report.  Her research focuses on the philosophy of biology and the philosophy of social science, and connections between the two.

Biography
Sandra D. Mitchell worked at the Ohio State University (1985–1989) and University of California, San Diego (1989–1999), before joining the Department of History and Philosophy of Science in 2000. She has been a fellow at the Center for Interdisciplinary Studies, at the University of Bielefeld (1991–1992), the Max Planck Institute for the Study of Societies in Cologne (2004–2005),  the Institute for Advanced Study, Berlin (1993–1994), and the Max Planck Institute for the History of Science (2010).

Mitchell received a B.A. in philosophy from Pitzer College (1973), a M.Sc. in Logic, Philosophy and Scientific Method from the London School of Economics (1975), and a Ph.D. in History and Philosophy of Science from the University of Pittsburgh (1987).

In her more recent articles, she has argued that the search for a unified, reductionist Theory of Everything is futile. Instead, she suggests that the sciences  focus on studying the complex correlations between elements and their emergent effects (self-organization) that, as she argues, a strictly reductionist approach is not able to adequately address.

Bibliography
1997 (edited with Peter Weingart, Peter Richerson, Sabine Maasen): Human by Nature: Between Biology and the Social Sciences, Mahwah, New Jersey: Lawrence Erlbaum Associates. 
2002 (edited with John Earman, Clark Glymour): Ceteris Paribus Laws. Dordrecht, Netherlands: Kluwer. 
2003: Biological Complexity and Integrative Pluralism, Cambridge: Cambridge University Press. 
2008: Komplexitäten: Warum wir erst anfangen, die Welt zu verstehen, Frankfurt: Suhrkamp, 
2009: Unsimple Truths: Science,Complexity and Policy,  Chicago: University of Chicago Press,

See also
American philosophy
List of American philosophers

References

External links

1951 births
Living people
Alumni of the London School of Economics
American philosophers
Philosophers of science
University of Pittsburgh faculty
American historians of philosophy
Philosophers of biology
Philosophers of social science
American women historians
20th-century American non-fiction writers
21st-century American non-fiction writers
20th-century American women writers
21st-century American women writers